Kirpichnogo zavoda 1 is a rural locality (a settlement) in Funtovsky Selsoviet, Privolzhsky District, Astrakhan Oblast, Russia. The population was 3,041 as of 2010. There are 138 streets.

Geography 
Kirpichnogo zavoda 1 is located on the Tsaryov River, 20 km southwest of Nachalovo (the district's administrative centre) by road. Funtovo-1 is the nearest rural locality.

References 

Rural localities in Privolzhsky District, Astrakhan Oblast